Myra M. Bennett, CM, MBE (April 1, 1890 – April 26, 1990) born London, England, died Daniel's Harbour, Newfoundland, Canada was a celebrated Canadian nurse.  Dubbed The Florence Nightingale of Newfoundland by the Evening Telegram, in tribute to her contribution to the people of the Great Northern Peninsula, she was also known simply as The Nurse.

Early life 
Bennett (née Grimsley) worked as a tailor in London before training as a nurse at Woolwich during the first World War. She later studied midwifery at Clapham School of Midwifery. She came to Newfoundland as a district nurse under the outport nursing scheme. Her plan was to travel to Saskatchewan but was approached by Lady Harris (wife of Sir Alexander Harris) and was made aware of the dire need for nurses in Newfoundland. She agreed and changed her plans to go to Daniel's Harbour in May 1921, at the age of 31. She stayed in Daniel's Harbour and started a family.

Career 
Myra quickly gained experience caring for the sick on the west coast of Newfoundland. In these areas of Newfoundland (like Parsons Pond) there were no hospitals or doctors available. Myra often made news headlines, often referred to as "Nurse Bennett of the Outports". She was known for being especially passionate and resourceful in the rural areas in which she worked. There are stories recorded that show the great distances Bennett would travel to get to her patients. When the need for hospitals was clear to Bennett she transformed her house into a hospital with the help and support of her 3 kids and husband.

Her work in Newfoundland encouraged the construction of new hospitals in Bonne Bay, Port Saunders and St. Anthony's.

The house that she lived in at Daniel's Harbour is now a heritage site.

Awards and honours 
 1935 - King George V Silver Jubilee Medal
 1937 - King George VI Coronation Medal
1946 - Member of the Most Excellent Order of the British Empire
 195? - Queen Elizabeth II Coronation Medal
 1967 - Honorary membership in the Association for Registered Nurses of Newfoundland
 1974 - Member of the Order of Canada
 1974 - Doctor of Science, Honoris Causa, Memorial University of Newfoundland

Legacy 

 Bennett's life as a nurse in outport Newfoundland was written in an article by Reader's Digest and a book entitled Don't Have Your Baby in the Dory by H. Gordon Green. 
 CBC TV also did a documentary on her life story, as well as, an interview with Peter Gzowski. 
 She is also the subject of Robert Chafe's play Tempting Providence (Playwrights Canada Press, 2004).
 She tells stories of her time as a nurse in Weekend Magazine's article Nurse Bennett of The Outports by Cyril Robinson.

See also

 List of people of Newfoundland and Labrador
 List of communities in Newfoundland and Labrador

References 

1890 births
1990 deaths
Canadian nurses
Canadian women nurses
Canadian centenarians
Canadian Members of the Order of the British Empire
British emigrants to the Dominion of Newfoundland
Members of the Order of Canada
Women centenarians